Partial general elections were held in Belgium on 11 June, 18 June and 15 July 1878. The result was a victory for the Liberal Party, which won 72 of the 132 seats in the Chamber of Representatives and 36 of the 66 seats in the Senate. Voter turnout was 62.5%, although only 56,640 people were eligible to vote.

Under the alternating system, elections for the Chamber of Representatives were only held in four out of the nine provinces: Hainaut, Limburg, Liège and East Flanders. Additionally, special elections were held in the arrondissements of Antwerp, Brussels and Kortrijk after these electoral districts got one extra seat due to population growth.

They were the first elections with strict guarantees for secret ballots following the law of 9 July 1877, which contributed to the success of the liberals.

Results

Chamber of Representatives

Senate

Constituencies
The distribution of seats among the electoral districts was as follows for the Chamber of Representatives, with the difference compared to the previous election due to population growth:

References

1870s elections in Belgium
General
Belgium
Belgium